Vishniac is the larger crater of the Martian surface feature called the Giant's Footprint. It was named after Wolf V. Vishniac, a microbiologist who died on an expedition to Antarctica. Fittingly, the crater lies in the Antarctic of Mars. The feature was originally observed by Mariner 7 in 1969. In 1999, the Mars Global Surveyor's Mars Orbiter Camera was able to provide more detailed pictures. Its name was approved by the International Astronomical Union in 1976.

References 

Impact craters on Mars
Mare Australe quadrangle